The Miss Perú 2009 pageant was held on April 4, 2009. That year, 22 candidates were competing for the national crown. The chosen winner represented Perú in Miss Universe 2009. The rest of the finalists would enter in different pageants.

Placements

Special Awards

 Best Regional Costume - Puno - Dessire Villar
 Miss Photogenic - Huánuco- Carolina Gamarra
 Miss Elegance - Cajamarca - Silvana Vásquez Monier
 Miss Body - Amazonas - Karen Schwarz
 Best Hair - Ica - Sofía del Pinho
 Miss Congeniality - Junin - Alexandra Hidalgo
 Most Beautiful Face - Ica - Sofía del Pinho
 Best Smile - Huánuco- Carolina Gamarra
 Miss Aquavit - Tacna - Karen Menéndez

Delegates

Amazonas - Karen Susana Schwarz Espinoza
Áncash - Gisella Dayana Cava Rivera
Arequipa - Pamela Gonzáles Palomino
Ayacucho - Jessica Schialer Brunetti
Cajamarca - Silvana Sofía Vásquez Monier
Callao - Karla Wendy Flores Guerra
Cuzco - Vanessa Claudia Castillo Aranda 
Huancavelica - Bárbara Merino Ibañez
Huánuco - Carolina Gamarra Calleja
Ica - Sofía del Pinho
Junín - Alexandra Hidalgo Schuster 
La Libertad - Pamela de la Flor Loly
Lambayeque - Danea Panta
Loreto - Kory Alegría 
Madre de Dios - Lilibeth Witting Ubaldo
Pasco - Aymi Dean Carnero Dionisio
Piura - Carol María Alvarado 
Puno - Dessire Villar Huamani 
Region Lima - Mayra Alejandra Chang Beltrán
San Martín - Nancy Sandoval Rengifo
Tacna - Karen Alicia Menéndez Calle
Tumbes - Kerly Acuña Quevedo

Judges

Luisa María Cuculiza - Congressmember
Fred Vellon - Creative Director of MAC cosmetics
Jessica Tapia - TV Host & Miss Asia-Pacific 1994
Luis Barrenechea - Plastic Surgeon
Luis Argüelles - Manager of public relations of Panamericana Televisión
Monica Chacón - Miss World Peru 1996
Nacho del Águila - Professional Stylist of Tomy's
Olga Zumarán - TV Actress & Miss Peru 1978

Trivia

 Karen became the third Miss Amazonas to win that title since the Miss Peru pageant first began in 1952. The first one was Maria Esther Brambilla, Miss Peru 1968, and the other one was Paola Dellepiane Miss Peru 1995. Karen has German and Peruvian ancestry.

Kori Alegría, Miss Loreto died on March 17, 2010, in a motorcycle accident in Iquitos.

Background Music

Opening Show – Eva Ayllón - "Enamorada de Estar Aqui"

Swimsuit Competition – The Ting Tings - "Shut Up and Let Me Go"

Evening Gown Competition – Jean Paul Strauss - "De Todo lo Mio"

References

External links
Official website

Miss Peru
2009 in Peru
2009 beauty pageants